Sultan Rashad McCullough (born February 12, 1980) is a retired American football running back. He has played in the National Football League for the Washington Redskins and in the Canadian Football League (CFL) for the Montreal Alouettes.

During his college career, McCullough was also a standout as a sprinter, as he was the 1999 Pac-10 champion in the 100 meter dash. McCullough is regarded as the fastest player ever to play for the USC Trojans. His brother Saladin McCullough also played professional football.

High school career
McCullough attended John Muir High School in Pasadena, California where he was one of the top sprinters in the state.  Along with Obea Moore, he led his team to a CIF State title in the 4×100 relay and was favored to win the state title in the sprint events when he pulled up in the 100 final.  His team still holds the meet record at the prestigious Arcadia Invitational.

College career
McCullough played college football at the University of Southern California.

Professional career
McCullough has played for the Washington Redskins playing in one game, carrying the ball once for 9 yards and three catches for 13 yards. He was also on the practice squad for the Cleveland Browns.

References

External links
TSN bio

1980 births
Living people
Players of American football from Pasadena, California
Players of Canadian football from Pasadena, California
American football running backs
USC Trojans football players
Washington Redskins players
Canadian football running backs
Montreal Alouettes players